Eugene Frank Milone (born 1939, Bronx, NY) is an American astronomer. He received a bachelor's degree from Columbia University in 1961, and a Ph.D. in astronomy from Yale University.  After teaching for several years at Gettysburg College where he was assistant professor of Physics, he re-located in 1971 to the University of Calgary, where he served as Director of the Rothney Astrophysical Observatory.

Milone has published many technical papers in various areas of astronomical research, particularly specializing in variable stars and photometry and archaeoastronomy, and has served on several professional committees.

References

External links
home page at the University of Calgary

20th-century American astronomers
20th-century Canadian astronomers
Living people
1939 births
Columbia College (New York) alumni
Yale University alumni

Academic staff of the University of Calgary